Robert Louis Briggs (born January 12, 1941) is a former American football fullback in the National Football League for the Washington Redskins. He played college football at the University of Central Oklahoma and was drafted in the tenth round of the 1965 NFL Draft. Briggs went to Carver High School in Amarillo, Texas.

1941 births
Living people
Sportspeople from Amarillo, Texas
American football fullbacks
Washington Redskins players
Central Oklahoma Bronchos football players
Players of American football from Texas